Okçu may refer to:

 Okçu, Bor, village in Niğde Province, Turkey
 Okçu, Göle, village in Ardahan Province, Turkey

OKCU may refer to:
 Oklahoma City University